On April 18, 2016, the body of fitness instructor Terri "Missy" Bevers was found at Creekside Church of Christ in Midlothian, Texas. Bevers' murder garnered significant media attention after Midlothian police released surveillance footage from inside the church. Captured around the time period shortly before Bevers' murder, the surveillance footage shows an unknown person, dressed in what appears to be police tactical gear, walking around the church's hallways while occasionally breaking glass and opening doors. Police believe the person in the video is Bevers' murderer. Few developments have been made since the investigation commenced, and the assailant remains at large.

Background 
Terri "Missy" Bevers was born on August 9, 1970, in Graham, Texas. Wedded to Brandon Bevers in 1998, Missy was a mother to three daughters, and the family resided in Red Oak. Missy Bevers worked as a fitness instructor, holding Camp Gladiator bootcamps at Midlothian's Creekside Church of Christ, only twenty minutes away from her residence.

Murder 
Before dawn on April 18, 2016, there was a heavy thunderstorm in Midlothian. The night before her murder, Bevers informed her students that the fitness class would be held inside the church due to the unfavorable weather, as opposed to the typical site at the church's parking lot. Bevers was last seen on unreleased surveillance footage entering the church at 4:18 a.m while preparing for her upcoming fitness class that was set to start at 5 a.m.. Shortly after 5 a.m., a student of Bevers' fitness class entered the church, stumbling upon Bevers' body. Emergency services were called and the crime scene investigated. Bevers was pronounced dead shortly after the police arrived.

Investigation 
Bevers was found dead with several puncture wounds to the head and chest. A police warrant alleged that these wounds were “consistent with tools the suspect was carrying throughout the building." Although police did not confirm whether it was the weapon of murder, the hammer was found alongside other tools near Bevers's body.

Police checked the church's surveillance camera system early on during the investigation. Although cameras outside the church were not functioning on the day of the murder, cameras inside the church were functional and surveillance footage was recovered. Surveillance footage at around 4 a.m. appears to show the suspect of an unknown gender and identity walking in the church's hallways while occasionally smashing glass and attempting to open doors lining the church hallways. The suspect wore what appeared to be SWAT police outfit and tactical gear from head to toe, including a "POLICE"-marked vest, a black helmet, and a black pair of gloves.  Bevers was in the midst of transporting her exercise gear from her truck and into the church when she presumably encountered the suspect inside the church. Surveillance footage shows Bevers walking down the church hallways before her murder, although this specific footage has not been released to the public by the Midlothian police. Midlothian Police has also not revealed where they crossed paths. It is believed that the suspect murdered Bevers in a violent encounter inside the church.

Investigators first believed the suspect to be a male. However, police later changed their position, stating that although the suspect's gait appears to be feminine, the suspect's gender is not known for sure. Investigators also made note of the suspect's distinct walking gait. The suspect in the surveillance footage appears to walk slowly, sometimes steadying themselves with the wall while having trouble moving their right foot or leg. Midlothian police have stated that this distinct gait may have been due to a temporary condition.  In 2021, the FBI asked Dr. Michael Nirenberg, a forensic podiatrist, to study the suspect's gait. Nirenberg stated that the person's gait is affected by the weight of the gear and weapons, and that there is no relationship between gait and gender. He concluded that the suspect's gender cannot be determined solely from their gait.

Initially, police considered burglary as a possible motive for the break-in. However, they were unable to find anything missing inside the church. Bevers left behind several items, among them her purse and iPad. Sources revealed to WFAA that police now believe Bevers was not only targeted, but that the suspect planned to make the crime appear as if it was a burglary gone wrong. One of the warrants filed by police claimed that the suspect possessed a smartphone with which he might have stalked Bevers's schedules and recorded her murder.

Additional police search warrants allege that Bevers received "creepy and strange" messages from an unknown male on LinkedIn. Police also believe that Bevers might have conversed with her murderer preceding the crime. Law enforcement was able to track down a person of interest who spoke with Bevers over LinkedIn during Bevers's last months, but the person stated that the conversation was ultimately flirtatious and innocuous.

Bevers's relatives were questioned during the investigation. The alibis of Brandon, who is Missy's husband, and Randy, who is Missy's father-in-law, were confirmed. Brandon was in Mississippi fishing, while Randy was in California traveling. Suspicions were roused when a published search warrant reported Randy, four days after the murder, bringing to a dry cleaner a bloodied shirt. Randy later explained the blood as dog blood spilled by two dogs fighting. Midlothian police performed a forensic analysis on the shirt, confirming the absence of human blood and the presence of dog blood.

Initially, a reward was set at $10,000 before doubling to $20,000 and rising to $50,000. As of 2021, there is a reward of $150,000 for information potentially helpful in capturing the suspect.

According to Midlothian police, tips are received about the case on a daily basis. As of 2022, a podcast called True Crime Broads discusses the case, and was first launched with the intention of keeping people talking about the case. The podcast creators also maintain a billboard advertising the $150,000 reward for any information that could help solve the murder.

See also 
 List of unsolved murders (2000–present)

References 

2016 murders in the United States
April 2016 events in the United States
American murder victims
Deaths by person in Texas
Female murder victims
People murdered in Texas
Unsolved murders in the United States
Violence against women in the United States